Adele Bei Ciufoli (4 May 1904 – 15 October 1976) was an Italian trade unionist and politician. She was elected to the Constituent Assembly in 1946 as part of the first group of women parliamentarians in Italy. She was subsequently appointed to the Senate in 1948 and then elected to the Chamber of Deputies in 1953. She remained a member of parliament until 1963.

Biography
Bei was born in Cantiano in 1904, the third of eleven children of Angela Broccoli and Davide Bei, a woodcutter. With her family suffering from poverty, she began working as a farm labourer aged 12. She met Domenico Ciufoli, a founder member of the Italian Communist Party, and the two married in 1922. Following the rise to power of Benito Mussolini, the couple left Italy in 1923, initially moving to Belgium. After their daughter Angela was born in June the following year, the family moved to Luxembourg. A son, Ferrero, was born in 1926 and the family subsequently moved to France, initially settling in Marseilles before relocating to Paris.

Bei herself joined the Communist Party in 1931. Under the name Battistella, she made clandestine trips to Italy to carry out liaison activities. She was sent to Rome in 1933, but was arrested and sentenced to eighteen years in prison by the Tribunale speciale per la difesa dello Stato in a trial the following year. She spent seven and a half years in prison in Perugia, and then two and a half years of house arrest in Ventotene before being released in August 1943 following Mussolini's removal from power. While she was in prison and Domenico was involved in Communist Party activities in Moscow and Paris, the children had been at the Ivanovo International Children's Home in Russia. Domenico was arrested in 1939 and spent World War II in Buchenwald concentration camp.

Following her release, Bei resumed Communist Party activities and was part of the resistance to the Italian Social Republic in Rome. After Rome was liberated in 1944, she became head of the women's advisory commission of the Italian General Confederation of Labour (CGIL) and was amongst the founders of the Union of Italian Women. In 1945 she travelled to the Soviet Union as part of a trade union delegation and had brought her children back to Italy. However, Ferraro died shortly after the move to Italy, and around the same time, her marriage broke down.

Later in 1945 Bei was appointed to the National Council by the CGIL. She was a Communist Party candidate in Marche in the 1946 general elections and was one of 21 women elected. Following the 1948 elections she was appointed to the Senate as a 'Senator-by-right', a position reserved for members of the Constituent Assembly who had been jailed for five or more years, or had held office before Mussolini came to power. She successfully ran as a Communist Party candidate for the Chamber of Deputies in Ancona in the 1953 elections and was re-elected in 1958, serving until 1963.

Bei died in Rome in 1976.

References

External links
Adele Bei Chamber of Deputies

1904 births
Italian Communist Party politicians
Italian trade unionists
Members of the Constituent Assembly of Italy
Members of the Senate of the Republic (Italy)
Members of the Chamber of Deputies (Italy)
1976 deaths
20th-century Italian women politicians
Women members of the Chamber of Deputies (Italy)
Women members of the Senate of the Republic (Italy)